Koforidua, also popularly known as K-dua or Koftown, is a city and the capital of Eastern Region in southern Ghana. Koforidua was founded in 1875 by migrants from Ashanti. It is also called New Juaben. The city has a settlement city proper population of 183,727 people as of 2010, 
 Koforidua is an amalgamation of two Municipalities; New Juaben North and South. The city has a blend of colonial and modern architecture.

Koforidua serves as a commercial center and Regional Capital for the Eastern region and New Juaben Municipal District. The city is home to many businesses, with the exception of heavy duty industries. The city is home to Intravenous Infusions Ltd., one of the oldest pharmaceutical companies in Ghana and West Africa, a leading producer of injections and drips. The company is listed on the Ghana Stock exchange and was registered in 1969. 
The city is home to many Government Departments and Ministries at the Regional level. The recent construction of the four-lane highway road linking the Koforidua Technical University and Koforidua to Oyoko brings commerce to the city. The highway also serves as a valid alternative route to reach Kumasi.

Etymology
Oral tradition has it that, Koforidua owes its name to an Akan man, Kofi Ofori, who had built his hut under a huge mahogany tree. This tree provided shelter for weary farmers who were returning from their farms after a hard day's work. Over time, it became common for the farmers to say that they were going to rest under Kofi Ofori's tree. In Akan language, Twi, the word for tree is "dua". An amalgamation of Kofi Ofori's name and tree, therefore, becomes "Koforidua."
Koforidua today is a multi-ethnic city with people from various ethnic groups in Ghana calling the city their home.

History
Koforidua was founded in 1875 by Akan migrants from Asanteman. The completion of the Kumasi railway in 1923 saw Koforidua become an important road and rail junction. Koforidua is one of the country's oldest cocoa-producing centers. It is also noted today for its weekly Thursday bead market, which draws bead buyers and sellers from all over the Eastern region.

Legend about Koforidua
Legend has it that, the Obuotabiri mountain found in New Juabeng, was the home of the gods and protected the people. It was believed to be inhabited by dwarfs and thus was considered the soul of the New Juabeng traditional area. All the townsfolk have great reverence for the mountain: OBUOTABIRI - the rock of Tabiri.

Geography

The New Juaben Municipality falls within the Eastern Region of South Ghana. The municipality covers an estimated area of 110 square kilometres, constituting 0.57% of the total land area of the Eastern Region. The municipality has 48 electoral areas.

The New-Juaben municipality shares boundaries with East-Akim Municipality to the northeast, Akwapim North District to the east and south, and Suhum-Kraboa-Coaltar District to the west. The city of Koforidua (New Juabeng) is made up of several neighbourhoods and settlements, including Effiduase, Asokore, Oyoko, Jumapo, Suhyen, Dansuagya, Betom, and Srodae.  Koforidua is two hours by road from Accra.

Climate
Koforidua, owing to its location in the heart of the Dahomey Gap, has a hot semi-arid climate (Köppen BSh). The weather is hot and humid year-round, but significant rainfall is usually only seen between April and June, although in wetter years in September and October also will see substantial falls.

Demographics

Presently the city's population is 127,334 people and is dominated by Akans. The 'Akwantukese' (The Big Journey Festival) is celebrated yearly to mark the movement of the inhabitants of Koforidua's ancestors from 'Asanteman' to their present location of Koforidua.

Economy

Industries
The city is home to one of Ghana's oldest pharmaceutical Manufacturing companies i.e. Intravenous infusion Ltd which manufactures drips and injections for the West African Market. Other Industrial activities of Koforidua include textiles, crafts, soap, carpentry and joinery, traditional medicine, pottery and ceramics, and the production of alcoholic and non-alcoholic beverages.

Financial Services 
Koforidua is also home to many financial services companies ranging from Universal Banks, Micro-finance, Rural Banks and Savings and Loans Companies to Insurance Companies.

Agriculture
The city currently depends mainly on Government Administration, Retailing, hospitality, commercial and Education services. With inhabitants in the Cornubations (Outskirt surrounding communities) engaging in some form of subsistence farming.

Cocoa production
Koforidua produces cocoa. However, as cocoa production has moved westward to the Ashanti Region and Brong-Ahafo Region areas of virgin soil, Koforidua has become increasingly dependent upon its commercial and business administrative functions. The city of Koforidua has only small-medium scale industries today.

Tourism

Koforidua's predominant tourism attractions include such natural features as Obuo Tabri Mountain, which is considered sacred. Nearby is Akosombo Dam, which holds Lake Volta, the world's largest man-made lake.

Waterfalls in the area, such as Akaa Falls and Boti Falls, and the Umbrella Rock attract tourists to the Eastern region. Even though such tourist sites are functioning all year round, tourists are at times encouraged to visit the place at certain times of the year, especially during the rainy seasons. At such times, the Boti Falls in particular is fully at its peak beauty and very interesting to visit.

Education

Koforidua remains a major hub of education in Ghana. It is home to many basic schools and a number of prominent senior high schools in the country, Ghana. In 2012, one of its schools; Pope John Senior High School and Minor Seminary, was ranked 9th of the over 200 senior high schools in Ghana. The city also has a Technical University (Koforidua Technical University) https://www.ktu.edu.gh and two private universities (All Nations University College) and (Ghana telecom University College).
 and has campuses for other national Universities, the city also has a Teacher training college, Nursing and Midwifery College and other educational institutions.
There are other High Schools in Koforidua. These include; Koforidua Secondary Technical Senior High School (K.S.T.S), Pope John Senior High and Junior Seminary (Pojoss), Oti Boateng Senior High School (Oboss), Pentecost Senior High School (Pensec), Ghana Senior High School (Ghanass, Koforidua), New Juabeng Senior High School (Njuasco), SDA Senior High School (Sedass), Oyoko Methodist Senior High School (Omess), amongst some other technical (Koforidua Technical Institute) and Private Vocational Schools. The Senior High schools train students from all over Ghana, preparing them for the West African Senior School Certificate Examination (WASSCE). Passing WASSCE is essential to getting into Universities and other Tertiary Institutions in Ghana. It is also worth mentioning that schools like Ghanass, Pojoss, Sectech among others have been consistent in representing the municipality and the region as large in the famous annual National Science and Maths Quiz.

Accommodation

Koforidua has several hotels. Royal Plaza hotel, Capital View Hotel, Eastern Premier, Canadian Dreams Hotel, Oyinka Hotel, Bedtime Hotel, Partners May Hotel among others in town.

See also
 Railway stations in Ghana
 Aburi Botanical Gardens
 Awuah Panin III

References

External links

 Official site
 Ghana-pedia website – Koforidua

 
Regional capitals in Ghana
Articles containing video clips
Eastern Region (Ghana)